Bigna Windmüller (born 27 February 1991) is a Swiss ski jumper with one FIS Ski Jumping World Cup podium as an individual. She is set to compete for Switzerland at the 2014 Winter Olympics in the premier of Ski jumping at the 2014 Winter Olympics – Women's normal hill individual. Ski jumper Sabrina Windmüller is her older sister and significant to her being in the sport.

References 

1991 births
Swiss female ski jumpers
Living people
Olympic ski jumpers of Switzerland
Ski jumpers at the 2014 Winter Olympics